Attila Péterffy (born February 26, 1969) is a Hungarian politician and mechanical engineer. In the 2019 Hungarian local elections, he was elected as the Mayor of Pécs.

References 

1969 births
Living people
People from Pécs
Mayors of places in Hungary